Michael Browne (birth unknown) is an Irish former professional rugby league footballer who played in the 1990s. He played at representative level for Ireland, and at club level for Tallaght Tigers.

International honours
Michael Browne won caps for Ireland while at Tallaght Tigers 1995 1-cap plus 1 as substitute.

References

External links
Search for "Browne" at rugbyleagueproject.org

Living people
Ireland national rugby league team players
Irish rugby league players
Place of birth missing (living people)
Rugby league players from County Dublin
Tallaght Tigers players
Year of birth missing (living people)